This is a list of municipalities in Slovenia which have standing links to local communities in other countries known as "town twinning" (usually in Europe) or "sister cities" (usually in the rest of the world).

A
Ajdovščina
 Jurong, China

B
Bled

 Brixen, Italy
 Doberdò del Lago, Italy
 Henley-on-Thames, England, United Kingdom
 Velden am Wörther See, Austria
 Vračar (Belgrade), Serbia

Bohinj

 Ramsau am Dachstein, Austria
 Rosegg, Austria
 Stari Grad, Croatia

Bovec

 Prijedor, Bosnia and Hercegovina
 Sedegliano, Italy
 Tarcento, Italy

Brda

 Barban, Croatia
 Cormons, Italy
 Feistritz ob Bleiburg, Austria
 Matulji, Croatia
 San Floriano del Collio, Italy

Brežice
 Dobřany, Czech Republic

C
Cankova

 Łączna, Poland
 Šmarješke Toplice, Slovenia

Celje

 Budva, Montenegro
 Ćuprija, Serbia
 Doboj, Bosnia and Hercegovina
 Gaziantep, Turkey
 Grevenbroich, Germany
 Šabac, Serbia
 Shchyolkovo, Russia
 Singen, Germany
 Sisak, Croatia
 Slavonski Brod, Croatia
 Sombor, Serbia
 Veles, North Macedonia

Cerklje na Gorenjskem

 Medulin, Croatia
 Petrovec, North Macedonia

Cerkno
 Cassacco, Italy

Črna na Koroškem
 Arnoldstein, Austria

Črnomelj

 Antillo, Italy
 Duga Resa, Croatia
 Negotino, North Macedonia
 Terzo d'Aquileia, Italy

D
Destrnik
 Petrijanec, Croatia

Divača

 San Canzian d'Isonzo, Italy
 Sankt Kanzian am Klopeiner See, Austria

Domžale

 Euclid, United States
 Koprivnica, Croatia
 Rüti, Switzerland

Dravograd

 Frýdlant nad Ostravicí, Czech Republic
 Lučani, Serbia

G
Gorenja Vas–Poljane
 Planá nad Lužnicí, Czech Republic

Gornja Radgona

 Bad Radkersburg, Austria
 Bruchsal, Germany
 Mladenovac (Belgrade), Serbia

Gornji Grad
 Maria Saal, Austria

H
Hrastnik
 Raška, Serbia

I
Idrija

 Abbadia San Salvatore, Italy
 Almadén, Spain
 Aumetz, France
 Labin, Croatia
 Lepoglava, Croatia
 San Luis Potosí, Mexico

Ilirska Bistrica

 Duino-Aurisina, Italy
 Opatija, Croatia

Ivančna Gorica
 Hirschaid, Germany

Izola

 Międzyzdroje, Poland
 Pezinok, Slovakia
 Sutrio, Italy
 Szentgotthárd, Hungary
 Tolentino, Italy
 Treptow-Köpenick (Berlin), Germany
 Tropea, Italy

J
Jesenice

 Nagold, Germany
 Sankt Jakob im Rosental, Austria
 Tarvisio, Italy
 Valjevo, Serbia

K
Kamnik

 Andechs, Germany
 Budva, Montenegro
 Trofaiach, Austria

Kidričevo
 Crikvenica, Croatia

Kočevje

 Halluin, France
 Lübbenau, Germany
 Oer-Erkenschwick, Germany
 Prokuplje, Serbia
 Rab, Croatia
 San Dorligo della Valle, Italy
 Spittal an der Drau, Austria

Koper

 Buzet, Croatia
 Corfu, Greece
 Ferrara, Italy
 Jiujiang, China
 Muggia, Italy
 San Dorligo della Valle, Italy
 Žilina, Slovakia

Kranj

 Banja Luka, Bosnia and Herzegovina
 Bitola, North Macedonia
 Büyükçekmece, Turkey
 La Ciotat, France
 Colorado Springs, United States
 Doberdò del Lago, Italy
 Eisenkappel-Vellach, Austria
 Grožnjan, Croatia
 Herceg Novi, Montenegro
 Kočani, North Macedonia
 Kotor Varoš, Bosnia and Herzegovina
 Oldham, England, United Kingdom
 Pula, Croatia
 Rivoli, Italy
 Senta, Serbia
 Villach, Austria
 Zemun (Belgrade), Serbia
 Zhangjiakou, China

Kranjska Gora

 Santa Marinella, Italy
 Trogir, Croatia
 Waasmunster, Belgium

Krško

 Bajina Bašta, Serbia
 Cernavodă, Romania
 Chantepie, France
 Obrigheim, Germany
 Přeštice, Czech Republic

Kungota

 Foëcy, France
 Leutschach an der Weinstraße, Austria

L
Laško

 Mionica, Serbia
 Pliezhausen, Germany
 Trstenik, Serbia

Lendava

 Budavár (Budapest), Hungary
 Lenti, Hungary
 Szentgotthárd, Hungary
 Törökszentmiklós, Hungary
 Zalaegerszeg, Hungary

Ljubljana

 Ankara, Turkey
 Athens, Greece
 Baku, Azerbaijan
 Belgrade, Serbia
 Bratislava, Slovakia
 Brussels, Belgium
 Chemnitz, Germany
 Chengdu, China
 Cleveland, United States
 Graz, Austria
 Leverkusen, Germany
 Moscow, Russia
 Moscow Oblast, Russia
 Parma, Italy
 Pesaro, Italy
 Ploče, Croatia
 Rijeka, Croatia

 Skopje, North Macedonia
 Sousse, Tunisia
 Tbilisi, Georgia
 Wiesbaden, Germany
 Zagreb, Croatia

Ljutomer

 Fulnek, Czech Republic
 Užice, Serbia
 Wermsdorf, Germany

Logatec

 Gacko, Bosnia and Herzegovina
 Monrupino, Italy

Lukovica

 Amaroni, Italy
 Sankt Lambrecht, Austria

M
Maribor

 Chongqing, China
 Graz, Austria
 Greenwich, England, United Kingdom
 Hangzhou, China
 Jinan, China
 Kharkiv, Ukraine
 Kraljevo, Serbia
 Marburg, Germany
 Osijek, Croatia
 Pétange, Luxembourg
 Pueblo, United States
 Saint Petersburg, Russia
 Szombathely, Hungary

 Udine, Italy

Medvode
 Crest, France

Metlika

 Ronchi dei Legionari, Italy
 Wagna, Austria

Mežica

 Arnoldstein, Austria
 Xuzhou, China

Moravče is a member of the Charter of European Rural Communities, a town twinning association across the European Union, alongside with:

 Bienvenida, Spain
 Bièvre, Belgium
 Bucine, Italy
 Cashel, Ireland
 Cissé, France
 Desborough, England, United Kingdom
 Esch (Haaren), Netherlands
 Hepstedt, Germany
 Ibănești, Romania
 Kandava (Tukums), Latvia
 Kannus, Finland
 Kolindros, Greece
 Lassee, Austria
 Medzev, Slovakia
 Næstved, Denmark
 Nagycenk, Hungary
 Nadur, Malta
 Ockelbo, Sweden
 Pano Lefkara, Cyprus
 Põlva, Estonia
 Samuel (Soure), Portugal
 Slivo Pole, Bulgaria
 Starý Poddvorov, Czech Republic
 Strzyżów, Poland
 Tisno, Croatia
 Troisvierges, Luxembourg
 Žagarė (Joniškis), Lithuania

Moravske Toplice
 Biograd na Moru, Croatia

Murska Sobota

 Bethlehem, United States
 Ingolstadt, Germany
 Paraćin, Serbia
 Podstrana, Croatia
 Turnov, Czech Republic

N
Naklo
 Nakło nad Notecią, Poland

Nova Gorica

 Aleksandrovac, Serbia
 Gevgelija, North Macedonia
 Klagenfurt, Austria
 Latina, Italy
 Otočac, Croatia
 San Vendemiano, Italy

Novo Mesto

 Bihać, Bosnia and Herzegovina
 Brescia Province, Italy
 Herceg Novi, Montenegro
 Langenhagen, Germany

 Toruń, Poland
 Trnava, Slovakia
 Vilafranca del Penedès, Spain
 Yixing, China

O
Ormož
 Bytom, Poland

P
Piran

 Acqualagna, Italy
 Aquileia, Italy
 Bjugn, Norway
 Castel Goffredo, Italy
 Indianapolis, United States
 Karşıyaka, Turkey
 Mangalia, Romania
 Ohrid, North Macedonia
 Porano, Italy
 Sittersdorf, Austria
 Tivat, Montenegro
 Valletta, Malta
 Vis, Croatia

Pivka
 Durach, Germany

Postojna
 Supetar, Croatia

Ptuj

 Aranđelovac, Serbia
 Banská Štiavnica, Slovakia
 Burghausen, Germany
 Ohrid, North Macedonia
 Saint-Cyr-sur-Loire, France
 Varaždin, Croatia

Puconci

 Ćićevac, Serbia
 Tordas, Hungary
 Zabok, Croatia

R
Radlje ob Dravi
 Crikvenica, Croatia

Radovljica

 Ivančice, Czech Republic
 Sondrio, Italy
 Svilajnac, Serbia

Ravne na Koroškem
 Đakovo, Croatia

Ribnica
 Arcevia, Italy

Ruše

 Fažana, Croatia
 Rozier-en-Donzy, France
 Těšany, Czech Republic

S
Šempeter-Vrtojba

 Keutschach am See, Austria
 Medea, Italy
 Romans d'Isonzo, Italy

Šentjernej
 Svrljig, Serbia

Šentjur

 Jirkov, Czech Republic
 Neu-Anspach, Germany
 Požega, Serbia
 Saint-Florent-sur-Cher, France

Sevnica
 Nové Zámky, Slovakia

Sežana

 Montbrison, France
 Rab, Croatia
 Sant'Ambrogio di Valpolicella, Italy
 Sant'Ambrogio sul Garigliano, Italy

Škofja Loka is a member of the Douzelage, a town twinning association of towns across the European Union. Škofja Loka also has several other twin towns.

Douzelage
 Agros, Cyprus
 Altea, Spain
 Asikkala, Finland
 Bad Kötzting, Germany
 Bellagio, Italy
 Bundoran, Ireland
 Chojna, Poland
 Granville, France
 Holstebro, Denmark
 Houffalize, Belgium
 Judenburg, Austria
 Kőszeg, Hungary
 Marsaskala, Malta
 Meerssen, Netherlands
 Niederanven, Luxembourg
 Oxelösund, Sweden
 Preveza, Greece
 Rokiškis, Lithuania
 Rovinj, Croatia
 Sesimbra, Portugal
 Sherborne, England, United Kingdom
 Sigulda, Latvia
 Siret, Romania
 Sušice, Czech Republic
 Tryavna, Bulgaria
 Türi, Estonia
 Zvolen, Slovakia
Other
 Freising, Germany
 Maasmechelen, Belgium
 Medicina, Italy
 Obervellach, Austria
 Savogna d'Isonzo, Italy
 Smederevska Palanka, Serbia
 Tábor, Czech Republic
 Zell, Austria

Slovenj Gradec

 Český Krumlov, Czech Republic
 Gornji Milanovac, Serbia
 Hauzenberg, Germany
 Myōkō, Japan
 Morphou, Cyprus
 Vöcklabruck, Austria

Slovenske Konjice

 Gornja Stubica, Croatia
 Hlohovec, Slovakia
 Hranice, Czech Republic
 Kosjerić, Serbia
 Križevci, Croatia

 Tolfa, Italy
 Zvyozdny gorodok, Russia

Šmarješke Toplice

 Cankova, Slovenia
 Teplice nad Bečvou, Czech Republic

T
Tolmin

 Vicchio, Italy
 Villach, Austria

Trbovlje

 Lazarevac (Belgrade), Serbia
 Sallaumines, France
 Valandovo, North Macedonia

Tržič

 Dabas, Hungary
 Ferlach, Austria
 Ludbreg, Croatia
 Sainte-Marie-aux-Mines, France
 Zaječar, Serbia

V
Velenje

 Albacete, Spain
 Esslingen am Neckar, Germany
 Lukavac, Bosnia and Herzegovina
 Neath Port Talbot, Wales, United Kingdom
 Pljevlja, Montenegro 
 Prievidza, Slovakia
 Prijedor, Bosnia and Herzegovina
 Schiedam, Netherlands
 Split, Croatia 
 Valjevo, Serbia
 Vienne, France

Vipava

 Ilok, Croatia
 Lumbin, France

Vrhnika

 Čapljina, Bosnia and Herzegovina
 Gonars, Italy
 Iolcus, Greece

Z
Zagorje ob Savi

 Aleksinac, Serbia
 Havířov, Czech Republic
 Kemnath, Germany
 Omiš, Croatia
 Stari Grad, Croatia

Žalec
 Žatec, Czech Republic

Zreče

 Rača, Serbia
 Sedbergh, England, United Kingdom

Žužemberk

 Čachtice, Slovakia
 Golubac, Serbia
 Pregrada, Croatia

References

Slovenia
Lists of populated places in Slovenia
Foreign relations of Slovenia
Cities and towns in Slovenia
Slovenia geography-related lists